Dena-Marie Kennedy is a New Zealand born actress. She is best known for her appearance as teacher, Miss Agnes O'Flaherty in the New Zealand television series Seven Periods with Mr Gormsby, and has performed in numerous theatre and television productions.

Career
Kennedy graduated from Toi Whakaari: New Zealand Drama School in 2001 with a Bachelor of Performing Arts (Acting). She has worked in production in NZ Film Commission films and television productions including No1 Field Punishment, The Last Saint and The Inland Road.

She has been nominated for two Chapman Tripp Theatre Awards: in 2001 for Most Promising Female Newcomer of the Year for her role in Have Car, Will Travel and in 2005 for Supporting Actress of the Year for her role in Boston Marriage.

Filmography

Television

References

External links

Year of birth missing (living people)
Living people
New Zealand television actresses
New Zealand stage actresses
Toi Whakaari alumni
People from Christchurch